Michaela Convery is a camogie player, winner of a Soaring Star award in 2010 and an All Ireland Intermediate championship medal in 2011.

Other awards
Three Senior County Ulster Medals, Under-16 and U18 All Ireland B Titles, Intermediate Club Championship.

References

External links
 Camogie.ie Official Camogie Association Website

1989 births
Living people
Antrim camogie players